Que sera, sera is a 2002 Brazilian comedy film directed by Murilo Salles. It was entered into the 25th Moscow International Film Festival.

Cast
 Marília Pêra as Dona Fernanda
 Rocco Pitanga as MC PQD
 Ludmila Rosa as Cacá
 Caio Junqueira as Nando
 Débora Lamm as Ruth
 Nicete Bruno as Velha maluca
 Marcelo Serrado as Zé Henrique

References

External links
 

2002 films
2002 comedy films
2000s Portuguese-language films
Brazilian comedy films